"The Celtic Soul Brothers" (known as "The Celtic Soul Brothers (More Please)" on the album version) is a song written by Mickey Billingham, Jimmy Paterson and Kevin Rowland of Dexys Midnight Runners.

Background
"The Celtic Soul Brothers" was first released by the band in March 1982 as a single and was also the first song on the band's 1982 album Too-Rye-Ay.  The song was the first song recorded and released by the revamped Dexys Midnight Runners' lineup, which added fiddle players Helen O'Hara, Steve Brennan and Roger MacDuff and bassist Giorgio Kilkenny.  Reflecting the revised lineup, the song's instruments feature mandolins and violins rather than the horn fanfares featured in the group's earlier work.  The song was inspired by 1960s soul music, and co-writer Billingham has stated that The Whispers' song "Needle in a Haystack" was a particular influence, accounting for "The Celtic Soul Brothers'" unusual melody.  Co-writer and Dexys Midnight Runners' lead singer Rowland has stated that the song was about him and Dexys' trombone player Paterson; Rowland being Irish and Paterson being Scottish.  Rowland also stated the song expresses his devotion to the band.  Author Richard White calls the song "a stand aside, effervescent statement."  Critic Ned Raggett of Allmusic referred to the song as a highlight of Too-Rye-Ay.  Ira Robbins of Trouser Press refers to the song as "jolly, rollicking jug band fare."  Author Simon Reynolds called the song "a manifesto of a single."  Julie Burchill of New Musical Express remarked that although the song is intended to sound ethnically Celtic, it sounds more like a "Redcoat romp."   Author Maury Dean claims that this song was an inspiration for Roddy Doyle's 1987 novel The Commitments, which was later made into a 1991 film by the same title.

Personnel
Seb Shelton – drums
Giorgio Kilkenny – bass guitar
Big Jimmy Paterson – trombone
Mickey Billingham – organ and piano
Paul Speare – tenor saxophone
Billy Adams – guitar
Brian Maurice – alto sax
Kevin Rowland – vocals

"The Emerald Express" 
Helen O’Hara – violin
Steve Brennan – violin

Chart performance
It reached #45 in the UK on its initial release,  and #20 in the UK and #86 in the US when re-released in March 1983.  The song also reached #13 on the Irish charts.

Performances in other media
When the band appeared as musical guests on Saturday Night Live after the release of "Come On Eileen", this song was their second-half performance.
It has also been included on a number of Dexys Midnight Runners' compilation albums, including The Very Best of Dexys Midnight Runners, Because of You, Let's Make This Precious: The Best of Dexys Midnight Runners and 20th Century Masters: The Best of Dexy's Midnight Runners.  
A live version of the song, recorded shortly after the single release, is included on BBC Radio One Live in Concert.

Popular culture
"The Celtic Soul Brothers" was included on the soundtrack of the 1983 movie Breathless starring Richard Gere.

References

1982 songs
1982 singles
1983 singles
Dexys Midnight Runners songs
Music videos directed by Steve Barron
Mercury Records singles
Songs written by Kevin Rowland
Song recordings produced by Clive Langer
Song recordings produced by Alan Winstanley